Nitz may refer to:

People
 Karl Nitz (born 1932), German judo athlete
 Leonard Nitz (born 1956), American track cyclist
 Jai Nitz (born 1975), American former comic book writer and creator of the Chato Santana version of El Diablo
 Michael Nitz, perpetrator of the murder of Vincent Chin
 Neal Nitz (1954–2015), American farmer and politician
 Nitin Arora, from Nitz 'N' Sony
 Paul Nitz, American paralympic sprinter

Places
 Nitz, Germany

Other
 NITZ, communications technology

See also